Maione is a surname most prevalent in the Italian regions Campania, Lazio and Calabria. In Calabria a toponymic origin of the name (frazione Maione of Altilia comune in Cosenza province) is suggested.
Notable people with the surname include:
 Gia Maione (1941–2013), American singer
 Harry Maione (1908–1942), American mobster
 Italo Maione (1891–1971), Italian literary critic
 Jean-Pierre Maïone-Libaude (died 1982), French veteran of the Algerian War 
 Mathew Maione (born 1990), Canadian ice hockey player

References

Italian-language surnames